Robert Charles Colley (born 10 November 1954, in Christchurch) is a retired boxer from New Zealand who won the bronze medal in the Lightweight (-60 kg) division at the 1974 Commonwealth Games in his home town. He also competed at the 1976 Summer Olympics in Montreal.

1976 Olympics
Colley competed at the 1976 Summer Olympics in Montreal. He lost by disqualification in the first round of competition to Valery Limasov of the Soviet Union in the third round of their bout.

References

1954 births
Living people
Olympic boxers of New Zealand
Commonwealth Games bronze medallists for New Zealand
Boxers at the 1976 Summer Olympics
Boxers from Christchurch
New Zealand male boxers
Commonwealth Games medallists in boxing
Boxers at the 1974 British Commonwealth Games
Lightweight boxers
20th-century New Zealand people
21st-century New Zealand people
Medallists at the 1974 British Commonwealth Games